Mark Koevermans was the defending champion, but lost in the quarterfinals this year.

Sergi Bruguera won the tournament, beating Jordi Arrese in the final, 7–5, 6–3.

Seeds

Draw

Finals

Top half

Bottom half

External links
 Main draw

ATP Athens Open
1991 ATP Tour